Anthony Francis Vollack (August 7, 1929 – September 28, 2015) was a justice of the Colorado Supreme Court from 1986 to 2000, serving as chief justice from 1995 to 1998.

Biography
Vollack was born in Cheyenne, Wyoming, and his family moved to Fort Collins, Colorado when he was in high school. He studied at the Colorado Agricultural & Mining College (now Colorado State University), receiving a B.S. degree in 1951. Following service as an officer in the United States Air Force, he attended the University of Denver Sturm College of Law, graduating with a LL.B. in 1956.

Following law school, from 1956 to 1977, Vollack was in solo practice in Denver. In 1964, he successfully ran as a Democrat for State Senator from the 13th District, composed of Jefferson County. In 1968 he was re-elected for a second term representing the 16th District, including both Jefferson and Adams Counties. He was noted for his interest in issues of child welfare and good government.

In 1972, Vollack decided to challenge three-term Republican incumbent Gordon L. Allott for a seat in the U.S. Senate. He was defeated by Floyd K. Haskell in the Democratic primary. Haskell would go on to win the Senate race.

In 1977, Vollack's name was put forward for the District Court bench by the Colorado Merit Selection system, and he was appointed  by Governor Richard Lamm. In 1986, Vollack was elevated to serve as justice of the Colorado Supreme Court. He sat as chief justice from 1995 to 1998, during which he helped form the Colorado Judicial Coordinating Council, composed of state and federal judges, and used the power of the "Chief Justice Directive" to modernize court operations. In 2000, he retired from the bench. He then served as an alternative dispute resolution mediator with the Judicial Arbiter Group.

He received numerous awards for his community service, including in 1999 the Champion for Children Award by the Rocky Mountain Children's Law Center.

Personal life
On August 2, 1958, he married Imojean Shelton, a school teacher in Denver who had grown up in Memphis, Tennessee. They were introduced by Senator Estes Kefauver, whose secretary, Jowanda Shelton, was her sister. The couple had two children: Kirk Vollack, a musician and teacher, and Lia A. Vollack (Lurie).

See also
 List of justices of the Colorado Supreme Court

References

External links
 Opinions authored by Vollack, Courtlistener.com.

|-

1929 births
2015 deaths
People from Cheyenne, Wyoming
Colorado State University alumni
Sturm College of Law alumni
United States Air Force officers
Politicians from Denver
Democratic Party Colorado state senators
Colorado state court judges
Justices of the Colorado Supreme Court
20th-century American lawyers
21st-century American lawyers
20th-century American judges
Child welfare in the United States
Chief Justices of the Colorado Supreme Court
Military personnel from Colorado